Smoke and mirrors is a classic technique in magical illusions that makes an entity appear to hover in empty space. It was documented as early as 1770 and spread widely after its use by the charlatan Johann Georg Schröpfer, who claimed the apparitions to be conjured spirits. It subsequently became a fixture of 19th-century phantasmagoria shows. The illusion relies on a hidden projector (known then as a magic lantern) the beam of which reflects off a mirror into a cloud of smoke, which in turn scatters the beam to create an image.

The phrase "smoke and mirrors" has entered common English use to refer to any proposal that, when examined closely, proves to be an illusion.

History

Johann Georg Schröpfer 
Johann Georg Schröpfer coined the concept of smoke and mirrors as a common feature of stage magic and 19th-century phantasmagoria shows. The illusion technique traditionally uses a magic lantern or image projector and a light source to cast onto a conjured smoke in thin air to portray illusions of the floatation, existence and disappearance of objects.

James Breslin 
The earliest known use of the idiom came from the biography How the Good Guys Finally Won: Notes from an Impeachment Summer, published in 1975. It was written by American political journalist James Breslin, who accounted the Watergate political scandal in Washington first-hand. Breslin often alludes the impeachment political sphere to semantic images of "blue smoke and mirrors", where magicians use smoke and mirrors to accomplish illusions such as making objects misleadingly disappear. Towards the end of the 20th century, the term became commonly used to describe the complex system of political culture and affairs in the media and publications across the world. The application of the idiom "smoke and mirrors" in politics also led to the book Smoke and Mirrors: The War on Drugs and the Politics of Failure, published by journalist Dan Baum, and its popularity in modern media articles.

See also 
 Mirror Flower, Water Moon
 Pepper's ghost
 Theatrical smoke and fog

References

Further reading

 

Deception
English-language idioms
Magic tricks